Clifford Spooner (born 21 December 1933) is a British water polo player. He competed in the men's tournament at the 1956 Summer Olympics.

References

1933 births
Living people
British male water polo players
Olympic water polo players of Great Britain
Water polo players at the 1956 Summer Olympics